Silent Love is a 1977 Dutch drama film written and directed by René van Nie. It was entered into the 10th Moscow International Film Festival.

Cast
 Walter van Canoy
 Sem de Jong as Sem van Rijn
 Romain Deconinck
 Marielle Fiolet
 Chris Lomme
 Cor van Rijn as Sem's father
 Teddy Schaank
 Dore Smit
 Mary Smithuysen

References

External links
 

1977 films
1977 drama films
Dutch drama films
1970s Dutch-language films